Turneria is a genus of ants that belongs to the subfamily Dolichoderinae.  Known from Australia, they form small colonies of fewer than 500 workers, and nest in trees and twigs.

Species
Turneria arbusta Shattuck, 1990
Turneria bidentata Forel, 1895
Turneria collina Shattuck, 1990
Turneria dahlii Forel, 1901
Turneria frenchi Forel, 1911
Turneria pacifica Mann, 1919
Turneria postomma Shattuck, 1990
Turneria rosschinga Shattuck, 2011

References

External links

Dolichoderinae
Ant genera
Hymenoptera of Australia